= Hardee's 200 =

There have been two NASCAR races named the Hardee's 200:

- Hardee's 200 (Richmond), a Busch Series race run at Richmond International Raceway from 1992 to 1993
- Hardee's 200 (Charlotte), a Craftsman Truck Series race run at Lowe's Motor Speedway in 2003
